Time Bomb is a novel by British author Nigel Hinton which was first published in 2005. It is set in 1949 and tells the story of four boys who found an un exploded bomb where they played.

Concept
The concept came to the author whilst he was waiting at traffic lights in his car. He thought of the phrase 'I've never told this story to anyone because when I was twelve I swore on an oath in blood that I would never tell it.' It is also based on his childhood in the post war years.

Reception
Inis Magazine praised the narrative around the lives of the youngsters and the glimpses into their fears and their emotions.

References

2005 British novels
Puffin Books books
Fiction set in 1949
Novels by Nigel Hinton